Spotless is a French dark comedy-drama television series co-created by Ed McCardie and Corinne Marrinan, and produced by Tandem Communications (StudioCanal) in association with Rosetta Media. It premiered in France on Canal+ on 16 March 2015 and aired ten episodes until 13 April 2015. The series stars Marc-André Grondin, Denis Menochet, Miranda Raison, Brendan Coyle and Tanya Fear.

Synopsis
In London, Jean Bastière has been leading a quiet family life with his wife and two children for fifteen years. Perfectly integrated, he manages a crime scene cleaning business.

The balance of the harmonious existence is disrupted, however, when the brother, Martin, whom he has not seen for years, reappears. With this bulky brother, the secrets and wounds of Jean's past resurface. Faced with old demons he had chosen to bury, Jean will also face other problems. When Martin arrives with the body of a woman hidden in his van, neither one suspects a year with serious consequences is about to start.

Cast
Marc-André Grondin as Jean Bastière
Denis Ménochet as Martin Bastière
Miranda Raison as Julie Greer-Bastière
Doug Allen as Joey Samson
Liam Garrigan as Victor Clay
Ciarán Owens as Frank McElroy
Kate Magowan as Sonny Clay
Tanya Fear as Claire
Naomi Radcliffe as Maureen Devine
Lucy Akhurst as Nina Johnson
Jemma Donovan as Maddy Bastière
Niall Hayes as Olivier Bastière
Brendan Coyle as Nelson Clay
Izabella Urbanowicz as Rosie
Tolga Safer as Hakan
David Avery as Yilmaz

Production
Spotless is an Anglo-French production. It was co-created by Ed McCardie and Corinne Marrinan, and was produced by Tandem Communications (StudioCanal) in association with Rosetta Media. The first series was shot at West London Film Studios. The series was renewed for a second season by the Esquire Network in April 2016, before Esquire Network became defunct in 2017.

Broadcast
The series was aired by Esquire Network in the United States from November 2015 to January 2016. Internationally it was distributed by Netflix as a Netflix Original; it was later also carried by Netflix in the United States.

Episodes

References

External links
Official website

2010s black comedy television series
2010s British drama television series
French crime drama television series
Television shows set in London
2015 British television series debuts
2015 French television series debuts
Canal+ original programming
Television series by Tandem Productions